AWLU can refer to:

The Asian Women's Leadership University Project
The Aircraft Wireless LAN Unit, a product sold by Teledyne Controls